The Iraq national badminton team represents Iraq in international badminton team competitions and is controlled by the Iraq Badminton Federation, the governing body for Iraqi badminton. The Iraqi junior team competed in the Badminton Asia Junior Championships once.

The team made its international team tournament debut in the 2009 Badminton Asia Junior Championships mixed team event. Iraq also competes in para-badminton. The national team competed in the Pan Arab Games and has won two bronze medals in doubles.

Participation in Badminton Asia competitions 

Mixed team U19

Participation in Pan Arab Games 

Men's team

Women's team

Current squad 

Men
Qusay Abdulrahman
Ali Neamah
Amer Awad
Al Naies Husam
Turki Husam
Al Subaih Hussein
Karrar Hussein
Qusay Mohammed
Yousif Al-Humairi

Women
Raghad Taisir
Ola Hasan
Haneen Alhareb
Maryam Ali
Nada Odhafa
Basma Chasib
Sana Jamal Younis Eisaq
Inas Khalid Rashid

References 

Badminton
National badminton teams